JFK Airport may refer to:

 John F. Kennedy International Airport, an international airport located in Queens County, on Long Island, in southeastern New York City, IATA code JFK
 John F. Kennedy Memorial Airport, an airport located southwest of the Ashland, Ashland County, Wisconsin, IATA code ASX
 El Alto International Airport, an airport located southwest of La Paz, Bolivia, IATA code LPB, officially known as John F. Kennedy until 1999 when its name was changed

New York City Subway stations
Sutphin Boulevard – Archer Avenue – JFK Airport (New York City Subway), a two level station complex in the Jamaica neighborhood of Queens; serving the  trains
Howard Beach – JFK Airport (IND Rockaway Line), a station at 159th Avenue & 103rd Street in the Howard Beach neighborhood of Queens; serving the  train